Whitney Davis (born April 15, 1958) is an art historian, writer, and theorist. Davis has been teaching at the University of California, Berkeley in the art history department since 2001 as the George C. and Helen N. Pardee Professor of History and Theory of Ancient and Modern Art. In addition to an extensive list of publications in the field of Western art history, Davis has made major contributions to the field of queer theory and LGBTQ studies, such as the 1998 essay "'Homosexualism,' Gay and Lesbian Studies, and Queer Theory in Art History."

Career

Early academic career 
Whitney Davis attended Harvard College, earning an A.B. in 1980, later attending Harvard University to earn an A.M. in 1982 and Ph.D. in 1985. During this time, Davis held a position as a Junior Fellow in the Society of Fellows at Harvard from 1983–86, and wrote a dissertation titled The Canonical Tradition in Ancient Egyptian Art.

Early teaching career 
Prior to holding a teaching position at the University of California, Berkeley, Davis taught at Northwestern University from 1987 to 2001. During this time, Davis served as the Director of the Alice Berline Kaplan Center for the Humanities from 1995 to 1998, and as the John Evans Professor of Art History from 1998 to 2001.

References 

1958 births
American art historians
Women art historians
Queer theorists
Harvard College alumni
University of California, Berkeley College of Letters and Science faculty
Theorists on Western civilization
Living people
Historians from California